Risalah Arabic (رسـالـة) is the Arabic word for a treatise or philosophical prose within Islam. In Tayyibi Isma'ilism, Rasāʾil Ramaḍāniyya refers to the works composed by the Da'i al-Mutlaq for the most part during the month of Ramadan.

Style 
Each Risalah is essentially divided into two sections: the first contains supplication and eulogy, and the second, a variety of topics that generally conforms to the overarching theme of the Risalah. Each Risalah (epistle) is given a title gematrically equivalent to the Hijri year of its publication: "The context of the quoted texts is not left to the reader to determine, as in the two above-mentioned anthologies. Each text is preceded or followed by a commentary placing it within a specific theme or issue, such as the daʿwa hierarchy under the imams and dāʿīs, the nature of the authority of the dāʿī and the daʿwa dignitaries (ḥudūd), and the role and place of the believers in this world. In addition, each Risāla begins with the traditional introductory taḥmīd, original poems in praise of the Prophet and the imams, and extensive supplications showing a rhetorical mastery of the Arabic language. The Risālas typically end with opinions on legal matters by the author or by previous dāʿīs and daʿwa dignitaries."

Syedna Taher Saifuddin 
Syedna Taher Saifuddin "probably had more Ismāʿīlī texts at his disposal than any other Ṭayyibī scholar before him. The wealth and variety of quoted texts make the Rasāʾil al-Ramaḍāniyya a treasure trove of writings, which are otherwise inaccessible to non-initiates and low-ranking daʿwa officials."

A set of the Rasāʾil were presented to the Bodleian Library in the University of Oxford on behalf of Syedna Taher Saifuddin 12 July 1949.

Syedna Mohammed Burhanuddin

Syedna Mufaddal Saifuddin

References

Arabic words and phrases
Tayyibi Isma'ilism
Bohra
Ramadan